Warner Hall is a historic plantation in Gloucester County, Virginia, United States. Augustine Warner, progenitor of many prominent First Families of Virginia, and great-great-grandfather of President George Washington established the plantation in 1642 after receiving a royal land grant, and would serve in the House of Burgesses, as would many later owners. While Augustine Warner Jr. operated the plantation and served as speaker of the House of Burgesses, rebels associated with Bacon's Rebellion  sacked and looted it, as well as made it their headquarters after they sacked Jamestown. Warner sought compensation for goods valued at £845, or the equivalent of what 40 slaves or servants would produce in a year, which led to litigation with fellow burgess William Byrd, whom Warner blamed for supporting Bacon but who portrayed himself as a fellow victim. Warner had no male heirs, although his daughter Mildred would become the grandmother of George Washington, and his daughter Elizabeth married John Lewis, who assumed the house and surrounding plantation, as well as served in the House of Burgesses, as did their descendants until circa 1820. The house burned in 1840, and the two surviving (and used) outbuildings were joined circa 1900 to become a Colonial Revival mansion. It is currently operated as a country inn. The cemetery on the property, which includes graves of the Warner and Lewis families, has been maintained by the Association for Preservation of Virginia Antiquities since 1903.

The plantation was listed on the National Register of Historic Places in 1980.

See also
National Register of Historic Places listings in Gloucester County, Virginia

References

Houses on the National Register of Historic Places in Virginia
Colonial architecture in the United States
Greek Revival houses in Virginia
Colonial Revival architecture in Virginia
Houses completed in 1740
Gloucester County, Virginia
National Register of Historic Places in Gloucester County, Virginia